The  2023 Novak Djokovic tennis season officially began on 1 January 2023, with the start of the Adelaide International.

During this season, Djokovic:
 Surpassed his record of 373 weeks as the ATP No. 1 to 380 (as of 13 March 2023).
 Surpassed his record of 32 Grand Slam finals to 33.
 Surpassed his record of the highest career winning percentage (minimum 500 wins) from 83.35% to 83.48% (1046–207).
 Surpassed his record of 240 wins over top 10 ranked players to 243.
 Surpassed his record of 347 (previously tied with Federer) matches played over top 10 ranked players to 351.
 Surpassed Steffi Graf's record of 377 weeks as World No. 1 held by male or female.
 Tied Rafael Nadal's all-time record total of 22 men's singles major titles.

Yearly summary

Early hard court season

Adelaide International

Djokovic reached the final without dropping a set, then beat Sebastian Korda in the final 6–7(8–10), 7–6(7–3), 6–4 saving a match point in the second set. 

It was Djokovic's 92nd career title, and the first time he won a title in Adelaide since 2007.

Australian Open

Djokovic beat Stefanos Tsitsipas in the final, 6–3, 7–6(7–4), 7–6(7–5), to win his tenth Australian Open title and 22nd major overall, equaling Nadal's all-time record.

Dubai Tennis Championships

Indian Wells Masters

Djokovic withdrew from the tournament due to COVID-19 vaccine mandate rules from entering the United States.

Miami Open

Clay court season

Monte-Carlo Masters

All matches

This table chronicles all the matches of Novak Djokovic in 2023.

Singles matches

Doubles matches

Exhibition matches

Singles

Schedule
Per Novak Djokovic, this is his current 2023 schedule (subject to change).

Singles schedule

Doubles schedule

Yearly records

Head-to-head matchups
Novak Djokovic has a  ATP match win–loss record in the 2023 season. Bold indicates player was ranked top 10 at the time of at least one meeting. The following list is ordered by number of wins:

  Roberto Carballés Baena 1–0
  Enzo Couacaud 1–0
  Alex de Minaur 1–0
  Grigor Dimitrov 1–0
  Tallon Griekspoor 1–0
  Quentin Halys 1–0
  Hubert Hurkacz 1–0
  Sebastian Korda 1–0
  Constant Lestienne 1–0
  Tomáš Macháč 1–0
  Tommy Paul 1–0
  Andrey Rublev 1–0
  Denis Shapovalov 1–0
  Stefanos Tsitsipas 1–0
  Daniil Medvedev 1–1

* Statistics correct .

Finals

Singles: 2 (2 titles)

Top 10 wins

Earnings
Bold font denotes tournament win

 Figures in United States dollars (USD) unless noted. 
source：2023 Singles Activity
source：2023 Doubles Activity

See also

 2023 ATP Tour
 2023 Rafael Nadal tennis season
 2023 Daniil Medvedev tennis season
 2023 Carlos Alcaraz tennis season

Notes

References

External links
  
 ATP tour profile

Novak Djokovic tennis seasons
Djokovic
2023 in Serbian sport